Players and pairs who neither have high enough rankings nor receive wild cards may participate in a qualifying tournament held one week before the annual Wimbledon Tennis Championships.

Seeds

  Ágnes Szávay (qualified)
  Dominika Cibulková (first round)
  Olga Savchuk (second round)
  Stéphanie Cohen-Aloro (second round)
  Klára Zakopalová (qualifying competition)
  Andrea Petkovic (first round)
  Galina Voskoboeva (first round)
  Mathilde Johansson (qualifying competition)
  Sofia Arvidsson (second round)
  Youlia Fedossova (first round)
  Ahsha Rolle (qualifying competition)
  Lilia Osterloh (second round)
  Casey Dellacqua (qualified)
  Hsieh Su-wei (qualified)
  Renata Voráčová (second round)
  Yuliana Fedak (first round)
  Kristina Barrois (first round)
  Kira Nagy (second round)
  Laura Pous Tió (first round)
  Yuliya Beygelzimer (first round)
  Abigail Spears (second round)
  Stéphanie Dubois (first round)
  Alizé Cornet (qualifying competition, lucky loser)
  Akgul Amanmuradova (qualifying competition)

Qualifiers

  Ágnes Szávay
  Kristina Brandi
  Casey Dellacqua
  Nika Ožegović
  Jorgelina Cravero
  Ayumi Morita
  Olga Govortsova
  Hsieh Su-wei
  Tatiana Perebiynis
  Hana Šromová
  Yan Zi
  Barbora Záhlavová-Strýcová

Lucky loser
  Alizé Cornet

Qualifying draw

First qualifier

Second qualifier

Third qualifier

Fourth qualifier

Fifth qualifier

Sixth qualifier

Seventh qualifier

Eighth qualifier

Ninth qualifier

Tenth qualifier

Eleventh qualifier

Twelfth qualifier

External links

2007 Wimbledon Championships on WTAtennis.com
2007 Wimbledon Championships – Women's draws and results at the International Tennis Federation

Women's Singles Qualifying
Wimbledon Championship by year – Women's singles qualifying
Wimbledon Championships